This is a list of all qualifying competitions which are played to decide each national representative in the UEFA Regions' Cup.

Each UEFA member nation has one place in the biennial Regions' Cup, with the competitions in this list being organised by the respective nations' football associations. The winners of each tournament advance to either the preliminary or intermediary round of the Regions' Cup. Smaller members are allowed to submit representative national teams directly into the preliminary round, however.

See also
 UEFA Regions' Cup

References

External links
Official site of the UEFA Regions' Cup
RSSSF page containing information on all previous UEFA Regions' Cups

UEFA Regions' Cup